is a Japanese writer. She has won the Kyushu Arts Festival Literary Prize, the Bunkamura Deux Magots Literary Prize, and the Akutagawa Prize.

Early life and education 
Daido was born in Fukuoka, Japan and graduated from Fukuoka Central High School. Her father worked for the Japan Self-Defense Forces. She worked as a radio scriptwriter for several years before focusing on writing novels.

Career 
In 2000 her first published story  won the Kyushu Arts Festival Literary Prize and was nominated for the Akutagawa Prize, but did not win. An English translation of her short story "Milk" was published in the 2006 anthology "Inside" and Other Short Fiction. Since 2011 Daido has contributed a regular column to the Asahi Shimbun.

Daido has never married, and has claimed that marriage, children, or any particular sexual preference would constrain her ability to live her own life.

Recognition
 2000 30th Kyushu Arts Festival Literary Prize
 2003 128th Akutagawa Prize (2002下)
 2005 Bunkamura Deux Magots Literary Prize

Works

In Japanese
 , Kodansha, 2001, 
 , Bungeishunjū, 2002, 
 , Bungeishunjū, 2003, 
 , Futabasha, 2003, 
 , Kodansha, 2003, 
 , Chuokoron-Shinsha, 2004, 
 , Kobunsha, 2004, 
 , Kodansha, 2005, 
 , Asahi Shimbunsha, 2005, 
 , Bungeishunjū, 2005, 
 , Futabasha, 2005, 
 , Shōgakukan, 2006, 
 , Bungeishunjū, 2006, 
 , Kobunsha, 2007, 
 , Kodansha, 2007, 
 , Futabasha, 2008, 
 , Bungeishunjū, 2011, 
 , Futabasha, 2015,

In English
 "Milk", trans. Louise Heal Kawai, "Inside" and Other Short Fiction, 2006

References

1966 births
Living people
21st-century Japanese novelists
21st-century Japanese women writers
Japanese women novelists
Akutagawa Prize winners
Writers_from_Fukuoka_(city)